Clavatula nathaliae is a species of sea snail, a marine gastropod mollusk in the family Clavatulidae.

Description

Distribution
This species occurs in the Atlantic Ocean from Ghana to Gabon.

References

External links

nathaliae
Gastropods described in 2006